Ali Mohsenzadeh (born 13 February 1993) is an Iranian football goalkeeper, who currently plays for Naft Masjed Soleyman in Persian Gulf Pro League and also Iran national under-23 football team.

Club career

Zob Ahan
He joined Zob Ahan in January 2013. He made his debut as a starter against Gahar.

Naft Tehran
In summer 2013, he signed with Naft Tehran until 2017. He was the 3rd choice in first team after Alireza Beiranvand and Sosha Makani during first mid-season. He also played with U21s in 2013–14 season. After Sosha Makani's departure in winter 2014 and joining of Vahid Sheikhveisi nothing changed for him and he continued as 3rd Keeper with Naft Tehran. During the time he was under contract with Naft Tehran, he failed in making any official appearances.

Khouneh Be Khouneh
In summer 2015, he joined to Khouneh Be Khouneh for the season on loan from Naft Tehran. Like the time in Naft Tehran, he failed in making official appearance. He was the 3rd choice after Mohammad Hossein Naeiji and Sirous Sangchouli. In winter 2016, Khouneh Be Khouneh canceled his loan contract and he returned to Naft Tehran.

Persepolis
After his return from Khouneh Be Khouneh, he was released from Naft Tehran with a mutual agreement on 18 January 2016. On 19 January 2016, he joined Persepolis with a contract until 2018.  Mohsenzadeh was released from Persepolis at the end of the 2015–16 season after not appearing in any games.

Club career statistics

International career

U20

He was part of Iran U–20 participating in 2012 AFC U-19 Championship. He was the first choice of Akbar Mohammadi in qualifiers, but benched during the championship.

U23
He invited to Iran U-23 training camp by Nelo Vingada to preparation for Incheon 2014 and 2016 AFC U-22 Championship (Summer Olympic qualification).

References

External links
 Ali Mohsenzadeh at FFIRI.IR
 http://mohsenzadeh.blogsky.com

Iranian footballers
1993 births
Living people
Zob Ahan Esfahan F.C. players
Iran under-20 international footballers
Association football goalkeepers